Ray Quarles Edenton (November 3, 1926 – September 21, 2022) was an American guitar player and country music session musician.

Early life 
Ray Edenton was born into a musical family on November 3, 1926, and grew up near Mineral, Virginia. His first instrument was a banjo ukelele, and by the age of six he was performing with his two brothers and cousins at square dances around the area.

After serving in World War II with the United States Army, he joined guitarist Joe Maphis as the bassist in a group called the Korn Krackers, a regular feature of the Old Dominion Barn Dance show on Richmond Virginia’s radio station WRVA. In 1949, he moved to Knoxville, Tennessee, to work at radio station WNOX but was sidelined by a 28-month hospital stay with tuberculosis before moving to Nashville, Tennessee where he began to play acoustic guitar on the Grand Ole Opry.

Career 
Considered one of Nashville's most prolific studio musicians, Edenton played on more than 12,000 recording sessions as a member of The Nashville A-Team. He played on his first session, American country music singer Red Kirk's recording of "Lovesick Blues" for Mercury Records, in 1949, but his first appearance on a major hit came on Webb Pierce's 1953 single "There Stands the Glass. Edenton played on 26 of Pierce's 27 chart-topping country singles and also on such well-known recordings as the Everly Brothers' "Bye Bye Love" and "Wake Up Little Susie", Marty Robbins' "Singing the Blues" and Roger Miller's "King of the Road".

Other artists Edenton accompanied on record include Julie Andrews, the Beach Boys, jazz vibraphonist Gary Burton, Sammy Davis Jr., Henry Mancini, Reba McEntire, Elvis Presley, Johnny Cash, Leon Russell and Neil Young.

Though Edenton could play lead guitar — and a variety of instruments — he is best known as an acoustic and rhythm guitar player.

Edenton retired in 1991. He died on September 21, 2022, at the age of 95, in Goodlettsville, Tennessee.

References

External links 
 Ray Edenton at Country Music Hall of Fame and Museum
 
 
 Ray Edenton recordings at the Discography of American Historical Recordings
 

1926 births
2022 deaths
Musicians from Nashville, Tennessee
20th-century American guitarists
American country guitarists
American male guitarists
American session musicians
Guitarists from Tennessee
People from Louisa County, Virginia
Military personnel from Virginia
American ukulele players
American country banjoists
American country mandolinists
American acoustic guitarists
Lead guitarists
Rhythm guitarists
Country musicians from Tennessee
20th-century American male musicians
United States Army personnel of World War II